Lesley Head  is an Australian geographer specialising in human-environment relations. She is active in geographical debates about the relationship between humans and nature, using concepts and analytical methods from physical geography, archaeology and cultural geography. She retired from the University of Melbourne in 2021.

Biography 
Head grew up in the suburbs of Melbourne, Australia and has 3 siblings. She completed her doctoral degree at Monash University in Melbourne. She was in the Victorian public service for two years, then became a tutor at Monash, then was offered a lectureship at the University of Wollongong.

She became a Professor of Geography at the University of Wollongong and spent 28 years there, also serving as Department Head and directing the Australian Centre for Cultural Environmental Research (AUSCCER).

She has also worked in Sweden, as King Carl XVI Gustaf Visiting Professor of Environmental Sciences at Hogskölan Kristianstad (Kristianstad University), from 2005-06.

In 2016 she moved to Melbourne to chair the School of Geography at the University of Melbourne, with the title of Redmond Barry Distinguished Professor. She retired and became Professorial Fellow in 2021 when the School was disbanded and merged.

She is a former president of the Institute of Australian Geographers and has chaired the National Committee for Geography of the Australian Academy of Science. In 2021 she was elected President of the Australian Academy of the Humanities.

Expertise 
Head began her research career using palaeoecology and archaeology to study long term changes in the Australian landscape, then becoming more interested in human-environment relations and moving to research Aboriginal land use, ethnobotany and fire.

More recently, she has focused on relationships between humans and plants, such as backyard gardens, and issues of sustainability and climate change.

She has been a supporter and mentor of women in academia.

Awards and honors
 Redmond Barry Distinguished Professor, University of Melbourne (2016-2021)
 Vega medal, Swedish Society for Anthropology and Geography (2015)
 Australian Research Council Laureate Fellow.(2010 to 2014) 
 Fellow, Academy of the Social Sciences in Australia (2011). 
 King Carl XVI Gustaf Visiting Professor of Environmental Sciences (2005-2006)
 Fellow of the Australian Academy of the Humanities (2004)

Publications 
 Head, L., Saltzman, K., Setten, G. and Stenseke, M. (eds). 2017. Nature, Temporality and Environmental Management: Scandinavian and Australian perspectives on people and landscapes. London and New York: Routledge.
Head, L. 2016. Hope and Grief in the Anthropocene: Re-conceptualising human–nature relations. London and New York: Routledge. 
Head, L., Atchison, J., Buckingham, K. and Phillips, C. (eds). 2016. Vegetal Politics: Belonging, practices and places. London and New York: Routledge.
Gibson, C., Farbotko, C., Gill, N., Head, L. and Waitt, G. 2013. Household Sustainability: Challenges and Dilemmas in Everyday Life. Cheltenham: Edward Elgar.
Head, L., Atchison, J. and Gates, A. 2012Ingrained : A human bio-geography of wheat. Ashgate. 
Head, L. and Muir, P. 2007. Backyard. Nature and Culture in Suburban Australia. Wollongong: University of Wollongong Press, Halstead Press.
Head, L. 2000. Cultural Landscapes and Environmental Change. London: Arnold.
Head, L. 2000. Second Nature. The history and implications of Australia as Aboriginal landscape. New York: Syracuse University Press.

References

External links
 Official website
 
 

Living people
Academic staff of the University of Wollongong
Academic staff of the University of Melbourne
Monash University alumni
Australian geographers
21st-century geographers
Human geographers
Women geographers
Year of birth missing (living people)
Australian women academics
Australian women archaeologists
Fellows of the Australian Academy of the Humanities
Fellows of the Academy of the Social Sciences in Australia